Siraj-ji-Takri or Seeraj-ji-Takri is a Buddhist archaeological site located in Sindh, Pakistan. The Buddhist city of Siraj-ji-Takri is located along the western limestone terraces of the Rohri Hills in the Khairpur District of Upper Sindh. Its ruins are still visible on the top of three different mesas, in the form of stone and mud-brick walls and small mounds, whilst other architectural remains were observed along the slopes of the hills in the 1980s. 

Archaeological sites in Sindh
Buddhism in Pakistan
Former populated places in Pakistan
Buddhist sites in Pakistan
Khairpur District
Biagi P., Spataro M. and Nisbet R. 2002 - A Buddhist Town at Seeraj in Upper Sindh (Khairpur, Pakistan): Historical, Chronological, Archaeometrical and Archaeobotanical Aspects. Rivista di Archeologia, XXVI: 16-29. 
Biagi P. 2004 - Buddhism in Sindh & the Destruction of the City of Seeraj. Sindh Watch, Winter 2003 (4): 29-30. Washington.